Deadwood '76 is a 1965 American Techniscope Western film directed by James Landis and starring Arch Hall Jr. and Jack Lester.

Plot
A drifter, Billy May (Arch Hall Jr.) arrives in Deadwood, South Dakota. A child misidentifies him as Billy the Kid and the town turns against him. He becomes a fugitive chased by Wild Bill Hickok. He runs into his long lost father who was a Civil War Veteran for the Confederacy. His father has made friends with a tribe of Indians and admires the leadership of the elders in the tribe. He plans on joining forces and tries to get Billy to join but Billy is not interested. He is interested in finding gold and living in peace however that is not what is in store for poor Billy.

Cast
 Arch Hall Jr. as Billy May
 Jack Lester as Tennessee Thompson
 La Donna Cottier as Little Bird
 Arch Hall Sr. as Boone May (as William Watters)
 Liz Renay as Poker Kate (as Melissa Morgan)
 Robert Dix as Wild Bill Hickok
 Richard Cowl as Preacher Smith (as Richard S. Cowl)
 Jonny Bryant as Hubert Steadman
 David Reed as Fancy Poggin
 Gordon Schwenk as Spotted Snake
 Ray Zachary as Spec Greer
 Barbara Moore as Montana
 Hal Bizzy as Curt Aiken
 Read Morgan as Ben Hayes (as Reed Morgan) 
 Rex Marlow as Sam Bass
 Joan Howard as Mrs. Steadman
 John 'Bud' Cardos as Hawk Russell (as John Cardos)
 Ray Vegas as Indian 
 Jack Little as Bear Creek
 Bobby Means as Doctor
 Willard W. Willingham as Deputy Harding (as William Willingham)

Soundtrack
Deadwood
Music by Harper MacKay
Lyrics by Arch Hall Sr.
Sung by Rex Holman
https://www.imdb.com/title/tt0059093/soundtrack

See also
List of American films of 1965

External links

1965 films
1960s English-language films
1965 Western (genre) films
American Western (genre) films
1960s American films